The 100 Best Companies to Work For is an annual list published by Fortune magazine that ranks U.S. companies based on employee happiness and perks. Like the Fortune 500, the list includes both public and private companies. The list was first published in 1998. Cisco Systems received No. 1 placement in the most recent 2021 ranking, followed by Salesforce, Hilton Worldwide and Wegmans Food Markets.

 Methodology 
To compile the list, Fortune'' partners with the Great Place to Work Institute to survey a random group of employees from each company. A company's score is based on the "Trust Index Employee Survey" and the "Culture Audit."

According to the magazine, the Trust Index "asks questions related to employees' attitudes about management's credibility, overall job satisfaction, and camaraderie." The Culture Audit includes "detailed questions about pay and benefit programs and a series of open-ended questions about hiring practices, methods of internal communication, training, recognition programs, and diversity efforts."

The methodology has been criticized as being too superficial in focusing primarily on perks, leadership, and financial success as opposed to actual workplace culture and sense of purpose.

Results 
Alphabet has ranked first eight times and appeared every year from 2006 until 2018 (the company also disappeared from Glassdoor's similar list). Additionally, Wegmans, SAS Institute, W. L. Gore, REI, Goldman Sachs, TDIndustries, Publix, Four Seasons, Whole Foods, The Container Store, Cisco, Marriott, Genentech and Nordstrom have all have been on the list at least 17 times.

In 2011, finance professor Alex Edmans published a paper in the Journal of Financial Economics showing that the 100 Best Companies to Work For outperformed their peers in total shareholder returns by 2.1–3.5% from 1984–2009.

Previous years 

 1998
 1999
 2000
 2001
 2002
 2003
 2004
 2005
 2006
 2007
 2008
 2009
 2010
 2011
 2012
 2013
 2014
 2015
 2016
 2017
 2018
 2019
 2020
 2021
 2022

See also 

 40 Under 40 (Fortune magazine)
 Other Fortune lists

References

External links 

 100 Best Companies to Work For from Great Place to Work Institute
Current list

Fortune (magazine)
Annual magazine issues